The Cherokee National Jail or Cherokee National Penitentiary (Cherokee: Ꮳꮃꭹ Ꭼꮎꮥꮎ Ꮧꮣꮝꮪꭹ) was built in 1874 as part of a governmental complex for the Cherokee Nation in Tahlequah, Oklahoma. It served the Cherokee Nation until it was sold to Cherokee County, Oklahoma, which used it as a jail into the 1970s.

The prison, as built in 1874 for $6000, was a two-story building with a basement. The second floor has been removed and replaced with a flat roof. There are two sandstone porches on the main level, front and back,  with hipped roofs. The Cherokee National Jail was placed on the National Register of Historic Places on June 28, 1974. The jail is now a museum, named the Cherokee National Prison Museum.

See also
Oldest buildings in Oklahoma

References

External links
Cherokee National Prison Museum - Visit Cherokee Nation

Jails on the National Register of Historic Places in Oklahoma
Government buildings completed in 1874
Buildings and structures in Tahlequah, Oklahoma
Historic American Buildings Survey in Oklahoma
Museums in Cherokee County, Oklahoma
Jails in Oklahoma
Prison museums in the United States
National Register of Historic Places in Cherokee County, Oklahoma